Pel Hava (also Romanized as Pel Havā; also known as Pelleh Havā) is a village in Robat Rural District, in the Central District of Khorramabad County, Lorestan Province, Iran. At the 2006 census, its population was 218, in 36 families.

References 

Towns and villages in Khorramabad County